Final Four or The Final Four can refer to:

Sports
Final four, a general sports term that refers to the last four teams in a playoff tournament
Final Four, a trademarked term referring to the last four teams playing in the National Collegiate Athletic Association (NCAA) March Madness basketball tournament
Final Four College Basketball, a 1985 video game
EuroLeague Final Four, a professional basketball competition in Europe

Television
The Final Four (TV series), a Greek reality television singing competition
"The Final Four", an alternate name for "The Bracket", an episode of How I Met Your Mother
In Your House 13: Final Four, a 1997 professional wrestling pay-per-view event

See also
First Four
Final Five (disambiguation)
Frozen Four